Nemoda Boolya is a Tulu language drama film based on real story that took place 200 years ago in Bettampady near Puttur, later made drama of the same name. It was written and directed by B. K. Gangadhar Kirodian, and starred Preetham Shetty Kadar, Rajani in lead roles. The movie was produced by K Chandrashekar Mada under the banner of Kudradi Kuladevata Creation. Audio launch of this film was on 26 June 2016. The film was released on 22 September 2017.

Cast
 Preetham Shetty Kadar as Mynda
 Rajani as Parati Mangane
 Pradeepchandra Udupi as Annappa Ballala
 Ramesh Bhat
 Mandya Ramesh
 V.Manohar
 Raghuram Shetty

References

Tulu-language films
2017 drama films